Nasser Sharifi (born 4 July 1921) is an Iranian former sports shooter. He competed in the 50 metre rifle, three positions event at the 1964 Summer Olympics.

References

External links
 

1921 births
Possibly living people
Iranian male sport shooters
Olympic shooters of Iran
Shooters at the 1964 Summer Olympics
Place of birth missing (living people)